In Greek mythology, Oeneus was a Calydonian king. He introduced wine-making to Aetolia, which he learned from Dionysus and the first who received a vine-plant from the same god.

Family 
Oeneus was the son of King Porthaon and Euryte, and thus, brother of Agrius, Alcathous, Melas, Leucopeus, and Sterope. He married Althaea and became the father of Deianeira, Meleager, Toxeus, Clymenus, Periphas, Agelaus (or Ageleus), Thyreus (or Phereus or Pheres), Gorge, Eurymede, Melanippe and Perimede (although Meleager's and Deianeira's fathers could also have been Ares and Dionysus respectively). see Meleagrids.

Oeneus was also the father of Tydeus and possibly Melanippus or Olenias by Periboea, daughter of Hipponous, though Tydeus was exiled from Aetolia and appears in myths concerning Argos. According to Pausanias, Mothone was a daughter of Oeneus by a concubine. In some accounts, Polyxo was called the sister of Meleager and thus, can be counted among the daughters of Oeneus.

Mythology 
Oeneus slew his son Toxeus by his own hand because he leaped over the ditch.

Divine visit 
When Dionysus had come as a guest to Oineus he fell in love with Althaea and the king realizing this, he voluntarily left the city and pretended to be performing sacred rites. But Dionysus lay with Althaea, who became mother of Dejanira. To Oineus, because of his generous hospitality, he gave the vine as a gift, and showed him how to plant it, and decreed that its fruit should be called oinos from the name of his host.

Calydonian boar hunt 

Since Oineus had made sacrifices yearly to all the gods during the harvest ceremonies, but had omitted to honor Artemis, in anger she sent a boar of immense size to lay waste the district of Calydon. He sent out his son Meleager who promised that he would go with chosen leaders to attack the Calydonian boar. So began the Calydonian boar hunt during which the boar was killed by Atalanta and Meleager. However, an argument began as to who should take the boar's skin as a prize: Meleager gave it to Atalanta, but two of his maternal uncles, sons of Thestius, wanted the trophy for themselves, claiming that it belonged to them by the right of birth if Meleager did not want it. Meleager, in rage, killed them, which resulted in a war between the Calydonians and the Curetes, in which all of Oeneus' sons, including Meleager, fell.

Aftermath 
When Hipponoüs of Olenus, angered at his daughter Periboea because she claimed that she was with child by Ares, sent her away into Aetolia to Oeneus with orders for him to do away with her at the first opportunity. Oeneus, however, who had recently lost son and wife, was unwilling to slay Periboea, but married her instead and begat a son Tydeus.

The sons of Oeneus' brother Agrius deposed him but Diomedes, his grandson through Tydeus, put Oeneus back on the Calydonian throne (or the throne passed to Andraemon, husband of Gorge, due to Oeneus' old age). Oeneus either died of natural causes or was killed by the surviving sons of Agrius who laid an ambush against him while Diomedes was transporting him to Peloponessus. He was buried in Argos by Diomedes, and a town was named Oenoe after him.

Family tree

Notes

References 

 Antoninus Liberalis, The Metamorphoses of Antoninus Liberalis translated by Francis Celoria (Routledge 1992). Online version at the Topos Text Project.
 Apollodorus, The Library with an English Translation by Sir James George Frazer, F.B.A., F.R.S. in 2 Volumes, Cambridge, MA, Harvard University Press; London, William Heinemann Ltd. 1921. ISBN 0-674-99135-4. Online version at the Perseus Digital Library. Greek text available from the same website.
Diodorus Siculus, The Library of History translated by Charles Henry Oldfather. Twelve volumes. Loeb Classical Library. Cambridge, Massachusetts: Harvard University Press; London: William Heinemann, Ltd. 1989. Vol. 3. Books 4.59–8. Online version at Bill Thayer's Web Site
 Diodorus Siculus, Bibliotheca Historica. Vol 1-2. Immanel Bekker. Ludwig Dindorf. Friedrich Vogel. in aedibus B. G. Teubneri. Leipzig. 1888-1890. Greek text available at the Perseus Digital Library.
 Gaius Julius Hyginus, Fabulae from The Myths of Hyginus translated and edited by Mary Grant. University of Kansas Publications in Humanistic Studies. Online version at the Topos Text Project.
Hard, Robin, The Routledge Handbook of Greek Mythology: Based on H.J. Rose's "Handbook of Greek Mythology", Psychology Press, 2004, . Google Books.
 Pausanias, Description of Greece with an English Translation by W.H.S. Jones, Litt.D., and H.A. Ormerod, M.A., in 4 Volumes. Cambridge, MA, Harvard University Press; London, William Heinemann Ltd. 1918. . Online version at the Perseus Digital Library
Pausanias, Graeciae Descriptio. 3 vols. Leipzig, Teubner. 1903.  Greek text available at the Perseus Digital Library.

Princes in Greek mythology
Kings in Greek mythology
Family of Calyce
Aetolian characters in Greek mythology
Deeds of Artemis
Deeds of Zeus
Dionysus in mythology
Incest in Greek mythology